This is a list of bridges in Portland, Maine.

 Casco Bay Bridge (Completed in 1997 to replace the Million Dollar Bridge over the Fore River. It connects Portland and South Portland.)
 Martin's Point Bridge (Original bridge was completed in 1828. New bridge opened in June 2014.)
 Million Dollar Bridge (defunct; completed in 1916. Replaced by the Casco Bay Bridge. It spans the Fore River and connects Portland and Falmouth)
 Tukey's Bridge (Original bridge was in 1796 as a toll bridge. Current bridge was completed in 1960. Connects Munjoy Hill neighborhood with East Deering neighborhood.)
 Veteran's Memorial Bridge (original was built in 1954. A new bridge by the same name was completed in 2012. It spans the Fore River and connects Portland with South Portland.)

References 

 
Bridges, Portland
Maine transportation-related lists
Portland, Maine